Little Wonder may refer to:

 "Little Wonder" (David Bowie song), 1997
 "Little Wonder" (Augie March song), 2003
 Little Wonder Records, an American record label that existed from 1914 to 1923
 "Little Wonders", a song by Rob Thomas recorded for Disney's animated feature Meet the Robinsons
 Little Wonder (horse), a British thoroughbred racehorse
 Festiniog Railway Little Wonder, a narrow gauge steam locomotive built in 1869
 "The Little Wonders" an episode of the 1960s British television series The Avengers

See also
Small Wonder (disambiguation)